The 8th Annual Latin Grammy Awards took place on Thursday, November 8, 2007, at the Mandalay Bay Events Center in Las Vegas, Nevada. The show aired on Univision. Juan Luis Guerra was the night's big winner, winning 5 awards including Album of the Year. Juan Luis Guerra was honored as the Latin Recording Academy Person of the Year one night prior to the telecast.

Awards
Winners are in bold text.

General 
Record of the Year

Juan Luis Guerra — "La Llave de Mi Corazón" 
Beyoncé featuring Shakira — "Bello Embustero"
Miguel Bosé featuring Paulina Rubio — "Nena"
Gustavo Cerati — "La Excepcion"
Ricky Martin featuring La Mari and Tommy Torres — "Tu Recuerdo"

Album of the Year

Juan Luis Guerra — La Llave de mi Corazón
Miguel Bosé — Papito
Calle 13 — Residente o Visitante
Ricky Martin — MTV Unplugged
Alejandro Sanz — El Tren de los Momentos

Song of the Year

Juan Luis Guerra — "La Llave De Mi Corazón"
Belinda, Kara DioGuardi and Nacho Peregrin — "Bella Traición" (Belinda)
Fher Olvera — "Labios Compartidos" (Maná)
Franco De Vita — "Tengo"
Mario Domm — "Todo Cambió" (Camila)

Best New Artist

Jesse & Joy
Alejandra Alberti
Dafnis Prieto
Leilah Moreno
Ricky Vallen

Pop
Best Female Pop Vocal Album

Laura Pausini — Yo Canto
Ana Belén — Anatomía
Belinda — Utopía
Shaila Dúrcal — Recordando...
Ilona — Allá En El Sur

Best Male Pop Vocal Album

Ricky Martin — MTV Unplugged
Miguel Bosé — Papito
Andrés Cepeda — Para Amarte Mejor
Franco De Vita — Mil y Una Historias En Vivo
Aleks Syntek — Lección de Vuelo

Best Pop Album by a Duo/Group with Vocals

La Quinta Estación — El Mundo Se Equivoca
Jarabe de Palo — Adelantando
Jesse & Joy — Esta Es Mi Vida
Miranda! — El Disco de Tu Corazón
Porpartes — Solo Paz

Urban
Best Urban Music Album

Calle 13 — Residente O Visitante
Daddy Yankee — El Cartel: The Big Boss
Orishas — Antidiotico
Ivy Queen — Sentimiento
Leilah Moreno - VIP

Best Urban Song

Eduardo Cabra, Panasuyo and Rene Perez — "Pal Norte" (Calle 13 featuring Orishas)
Mathieu and Orishas — "Hay Un Son" (Orishas)
will.i.am, Daddy Yankee and Fergie — "Impacto" (Daddy Yankee featuring Fergie)
Leilah Moreno, Tchorta Boratto, Cindy - "Levanta a Mão" (Leilah Moreno participação de Cindy)
Don Omar and Eliel — "No Se De Ella (My Space)" (Don Omar featuring Wisin & Yandel)
Tres Coronas and Michael Stuart — "Mi Tumbao (Remix)".

Rock
Best Rock Solo Vocal Album

Fito Páez — El Mundo Cabe En Una Canción
Belo y Los Susodichos — Pisando Lo Fregao
Iván Ferreiro — Las Siete y Media
Rosendo Mercado — El Endemico Embustero y El Incauto Pertinaz
Ariel Rot — Dúos, Tríos y Otras Perversiones

Best Rock Album by a Duo/Group with Vocals

Los Rabanes — Kamikaze
Attaque 77 — Karmagedon
Bengala — Bengala
La Renga — TruenoTierra
Panda — Amantes Sunt Amentes

Best Rock Song

Gustavo Cerati — "La Excepción"
Bruno Bressa, Chalo Galván and Gerardo Galván — "Monitor" (Volován)
Panda — "Narcisista por excelencia"
Gustavo Napoli — "Oscuro Diamante" (La Renga)
Roberto Musso — "Yendo A La Casa De Damián" (El Cuarteto de Nos)

Alternative
Best Alternative Music Album

Aterciopelados — Oye
Kevin Johansen — Logo
Kinky — Reina
Vicentico — Los Pajaros
Zoé — Memo Rex Commander y el Corazón Atómico de la Vía Láctea

Best Alternative Song

Manu Chao — "Me Llaman Calle"
Kevin Johansen — "Anoche Soñé Contigo"
Héctor Buitrago and Andrea Echeverri — "Complemento" (Aterciopelados)
Vicentico — "El Arbol de la Plaza"
León Larregui and Zoé — "No Me Destruyas" (Zoé)

Tropical
Best Salsa Album

El Gran Combo de Puerto Rico — Arroz con Habichuela
Willy Chirino — 35 Aniversario: En Vivo
Issac Delgado — En Primera Plana
Andy Montañez — El Godfather de La Salsa
Tito Nieves — Canciones Clásicas de Marco Antonio Solís

Best Merengue Album

Juan Luis Guerra — La Llave de mi Corazón
Elvis Crespo — Regreso el Jefe
Limi-T 21 — Real Time
Kinito Mendez — Con Sabor A Mi
Toño Rosario — A Tu Gusto

Best Cumbia/Vallenato Album

Jorge Celedón and Jimmy Zambrano — Son...Para El Mundo
Checo Acosta — Checazos de Carnaval 3
Binomio de Oro de América — Impredecible
Alfredo Gutiérrez — El Más Grande con Los Grandes
Peter Manjarrés and Sergio Luis Rodríguez — El Papá de Los Amores

Best Contemporary Tropical Album

Oscar D'León — Fuzionando
Albita — Live At The Colony Theater
Aventura — K.O.B. Live
Richie Ray & Bobby Cruz — A Lifetime Of Hits... Live At Centro De Bellas Artes, San Juan, Puerto Rico
Nino Segarra — De Nino A Nino: Homenaje A Nino Bravo

Best Traditional Tropical Album

Bobby Cruz — Románticos De Ayer, Hoy y Siempre
Francisco Cespedes — Con El Permiso de Bola
Ibrahim Ferrer — Mi Sueño
La Charanga Cubana — A Comer Chicharrón
Alfredo Valdés Jr. — De La Habana a Nueva York

Best Tropical Song

Juan Luis Guerra — "La Llave de Mi Corazón"
Doejo and Juan José Hernández — "Arroz con Habichuela" (El Gran Combo de Puerto Rico)
Yoel Henriquez and Jorge Luis Piloto — "La Mujer Que Más Te Duele" (Issac Delgado featuring Víctor Manuelle)
José Gaviria Escobar — "No Te Pido Flores" (Fanny Lú)

Singer-Songwriter
Best Singer-Songwriter Album

Caetano Veloso — Cê
Jorge Drexler — 12 Segundos de Oscuridad
Amaury Gutiérrez — Pedazos de Mí
José Luis Perales — Navegando Por Ti
Silvio Rodríguez — Érase Que Se Era

Regional Mexican
Best Ranchero Album

Pepe Aguilar — Enamorado
Cristian Castro — El Indomable
Pedro Fernández — Escúchame
Vicente Fernández — La Tragedia del Vaquero
Pablo Montero — Que Bonita Es Mi Tierra... y sus Canciones

Best Banda Album

Los Horóscopos de Durango — Desatados
Alacranes Musical — Ahora y Siempre
Banda Machos — A Pesar De Todo
Graciela Beltrán — Promesas No
Valentín Elizalde y su Banda Guasaveña — Lobo Domesticado
Grupo Montéz de Durango — ¡Agárrese!

Best Grupero Album

Grupo Bryndis — Sólo Pienso En Ti
Caballo Dorado — Cabalgando En Las Canciones de Joan Sebastian
Víctor García — Arráncame
Los Acosta — Siluetas
Los Ángeles de Charly — Un Tiempo, Un Estilo, Un Amor

Best Tejano Album

Los Palominos — Evoluciones
La Tropa F — Exitos de Combate
The Legends (Tejano band) — Otra Vez Raices
Joe Lopez and Jimmy González & El Grupo Mazz for Mazz Live Reunion - The Last Dance
David Marez — Corazón de Oro
Joe Posada — Despacito

Best Norteño Album

Michael Salgado — En Vivo
Conjunto Primavera — El Amor Que Nunca Fue
Intocable — Crossroads — Cruce De Caminos
Pesado — Piénsame Un Momento
Siggno — Capítulo 5

Best Regional Mexican Song

Freddie Martinez, Sr. — "A Las Escondidas" (Joe Lopez featuring Jimmy González & El Grupo Mazz)
Edgar Cortazar and Mark Portmann — "¿Cómo Quieres Que Te Olvide?" (Pedro Fernández)
Carlos Alberto Agundiz — "Él No Eres Tú" (Los Horóscopos de Durango)
Teodoro Bello — "La Tragedia del Vaquero" (Vicente Fernández)
Edgar Cortazar, Adrián Pieragostino and José Luis Terrazas — "Me Duele Escuchar Tu Nombre" (Grupo Montéz de Durango)
Mauricio L. Arriaga and Eduardo Murguia — "Por Amarte" (Pepe Aguilar)
Luis "Louie" Padilla — "Por Ella (Poco a Poco)" (Intocable)

Instrumental
Best Instrumental Album

Chick Corea and Béla Fleck — The Enchantment
Ray Barretto — 
Ed Calle — In The Zone
Carlos Franzetti Trio — Live In Buenos Aires
Hamilton de Holanda Quintet — Brasilianos

Traditional
Best Folk Album

Los Gaiteros de San Jacinto — Un Fuego de Sangre Pura
Los Muñequitos de Matanzas — Tambor De Fuego
Mariza — Concerto em Lisboa
Sones de México Ensemble Chicago — Esta Tierra Es Tuya (This Land is Your Land)

Best Tango Album

Raul Jaurena — Te Amo Tango
Luisa Maria Güell — Una
Rodolfo Mederos Orquesta Típica — Comunidad
Vayo — Tango Legends

Best Flamenco Album

Ojos de Brujo — Techarí
Calima — Azul
Juan Carmona — Sinfonia Flamenca
Miguel Poveda — Tierra De Calma
Son De La Frontera — Cal

Jazz
Best Latin Jazz Album

Arturo Sandoval — Rumba Palace
Michel Camilo and Tomatito — Spain Again
Michel Camilo — Spirit of the Moment
Paquito D'Rivera Quintet — Funk Tango
Chucho Valdés — Keys of Latin Jazz

Christian
Best Christian Album (Spanish Language)

Marcos Witt — Alegría
Blest — Palabras del Alma
Daniel Calveti — Un Día Más
Pablo Olivares — Voy A Entregar Mi Corazón
Pamela — En Español
Paulina Aguirre — Mujer de Fe
Rojo — Con el Corazón en la Mano

Best Christian Album (Portuguese Language)

Aline Barros — Caminho De Milagres
Padre Juarez de Castro — Deus Está Aqui
Eyshila — Até Tocar O Céu
Cristina Mel — Um Novo Tempo
Robinson Monteiro — Uma Nova História
Oficina G3 — Oficina Elektracustika G3

Brazilian
Best Brazilian Contemporary Pop Album

Lenine — Acústico MTV
Zeca Baleiro — Baladas do Asfalto & Outros Blues ao Vivo
Carlinhos Brown — A Gente Ainda Não Sonhou
Pedro Mariano — Pedro Mariano
Paulo Ricardo — Prisma
Ivete Sangalo — Multishow ao Vivo: Ivete no Maracanã
Skank — Carrossel

Best Brazilian Rock Album

Lobão — Acústico MTV
Capital Inicial — Eu Nunca Disse Adeus
CPM 22 — MTV ao Vivo CPM 22
Mutantes — Ao Vivo — Barbican Theatre, Londres 2006
NX Zero — NX Zero

Best Samba/Pagode Album

Zeca Pagodinho — Acústico MTV 2 Gafieira
Jorge Aragão — E Aí?
Beth Carvalho — 40 Anos de Carreira: Ao Vivo no Teatro Municipal Vol. 2
Martinho da Vila — Do Brasil e do Mundo
Mart'nália — Mart'nália em Berlim ao Vivo

Best MPB Album

Leny Andrade and Cesar Camargo Mariano — Ao Vivo
Gal Costa — Ao Vivo
Guinga — Casa de Villa
Zé Ramalho — Parceria dos Viajantes
Monica Salmaso — Noites de Gala, Samba na Rua

Best Romantic Music Album

Cauby Peixoto — Eternamente Cauby Peixoto: 55 Anos de Carreira
Bruno & Marrone — Ao Vivo em Goiânia
Wanderley Cardoso — 40 Años de Sucesso do Bom Rapaz: Ao Vivo
Zezé Di Camargo & Luciano — Diferente
Fábio Jr. — Minhas Canções

Best Brazilian Roots/Regional Album

Daniela Mercury — Balé Mulato - Ao Vivo
Dominguinhos — Conterrâneos
Margareth Menezes — Brasileira - Ao Vivo
Sérgio Reis — Tributo a Goiá
Naná Vasconcelos — Trilhas

Best Brazilian Song

Caetano Veloso — "Não Me Arrependo"
Miro Almeida, Dória and Duller — "Berimbau Metalizado" (Ivete Sangalo)
Simone Guimarães and Francis Hime — "Carta á Amiga Poeta" (Simone Guimarães)
Arnaldo Antunes and Adriana Calcanhotto — "Para Lá" (Arnaldo Antunes)
Antônio Villeroy — "Rosas" (Ana Carolina)

Children's
Best Latin Children Album

Voz Veis — Cómo Se Llega A Belén
Acalanto — Vida Dde Bebê
Miguelito — Más Grande Que Tú
Zé Renato and Convidados — Forró Prás Crianças
Strings For Kids — El Sueño del Elefante

Classical
Best Classical Album

John Neschling — Beethoven Abertura Consagração da Casa Sinfonia Nº 6
Montserrat Caballé — La Canción Romántica Española
Southwest Chamber Music — Carlos Chávez: Complete Chamber Music Volume 4
Rolando Villazón — Gitano
Clara Sverner — Mozart Volume 3

Recording Package
Best Recording Package

Catalina Díez — Los Vallenatos de Andrés (Various Artists)
Luciano Cury — Mutantes Ao Vivo - Barbican Theatre, Londres 2006 (Mutantes)
Gringo Cardia — Biograffiti (Rita Lee)
Andrea Bardasano — Edición Especial (Motel)
Allan Castañeda and Sandra Masias — Serenata Inkaterra (Jean Pierre Magnet)

Production
Best Engineered Album

Allan Leschhorn, Luis Mansilla, Ronnie Torres and Adam Ayan — La Llave de mi Corazón (Juan Luis Guerra)
Mario Breuer, Gustavo "Pichon" dal Pont, Javier Garza and Giovanni Versari — A Tu Lado (Juan Fernando Velasco)
 Álvaro Alencar and Ricardo Garcia — Acústico MTV (Lenine)
Jay Ashby, Jay Dudt and Hollis Greathouse — Especiaria (Flavio Chamis)
Gil Cerezo, Carlos Chairez, Omar Gongora, Ulises Lozano and Cesar Pliego — Reina (Kinky)

Producer of the Year

Sebastian Krys
Benny Faccone
Carlos Jean
Cachorro Lopez
Phil Vinall and Zoé

Music Video
Best Short Form Music Video

Voz Veis — "Ven A Mi Casa Esta Navidad"
Calle 13 — "Tango del Pecado"
Kevin Johansen — "Anoche Soñé Contigo"
Maná — "Labios Compartidos"
Orishas — "Hay Un Son"

Best Long Form Music Video

Ricky Martin — MTV Unplugged
Chico Buarque — A Série
Andrés Calamaro — Made in Argentina 2005
Franco De Vita — Mil y Una Historias En Vivo
Ivete Sangalo — Multishow ao vivo: Ivete no Maracanã

Special Awards
Lifetime Achievement Awards

Alberto Cortez
Lucho Gatica
Olga Guillot
Os Paralamas do Sucesso
Los Tigres del Norte
Chavela Vargas

Trustees Awards
Joao Araujo
Leopoldo Federico.
Fernando Hernández

Performers
 Ricky Martin featuring Blue Man Group — "Lola, Lola / La Bomba" — 05:42
 Pepe Aguilar — "Por Amarte / 100% Méxicano" — 04:39
 Daddy Yankee — "Ella Me Levantó" — 04:04
 Camila — "Todo Cambió" — 02:35
 Jesse & Joy — "Espacio Sideral" — 02:36
 Shaila Dúrcal — "Amor Eterno" — 04:52
 La Quinta Estación and Aleks Syntek — "Me Muero / Intocable" — 04:26
 Intocable — "Te Lo Juro" — 04:11
 Orishas and Calle 13 — "Hay Un Son / Pal Norte" — 05:56
 Alacranes Musical featuring Kinky — "Sin Tú Amor" — 03:32
 Laura Pausini and Andrea Bocelli — "Dispárame, Dispara / Vive Ya" — 06:07
 Ivy Queen — "Que Lloren" — 03:36
 Conjunto Primavera — "¡Basta Ya!" — 03:24
 Miguel Bosé featuring Bimba Bosé — "Como un Lobo" — 03:34
 Juan Luis Guerra 440 featuring Sheila E. — "La Travesia" — 04:19

Presenters
Sofía Vergara and Pablo Montero — presented Best Norteño Album
Bárbara Mori and Eduardo Verástegui — presented Best Pop Vocal Album, Duo or Group
Alessandra Rosaldo and Wisin & Yandel — presented Best Merengue Album
Erika Buenfil and Sergio Goyri — presented Best Banda Album
Dayanara Torres and Benjamin Bratt — presented Best Urban Music Album
Los Tigres del Norte — presented Best Pop Vocal Album, Female
Aventura — presented Record of the Year
Willy Chirino, Vicky Terrazas and Marisol Terrazas — presented Best Ranchero Album
Patricia Navidad and Pau Dones — presented Best New Artist
Gloria Estefan — presented People of the Year
Karla Álvarez, Elvis Crespo and Pedro Fernández — presented Best Urban Song
Wilmer Valderrama and Angélica Vale — presented Best Pop Vocal Album, Male
Kate del Castillo and Rubén Blades — presented Album of the Year
Nora Salinas and Sergio Mayer — presented Best Alternative Music Album
Mala Rodríguez and Eduardo Capetillo — presented Song of the Year

References

External links
Univision: http://www.univision.com/content/channel.jhtml?chid=10383&schid=11335&secid=0
The Latin Academy of Recording Arts & Sciences, Inc. (LARAS): http://www.grammy.com/Latin/
Nominees: https://web.archive.org/web/20080207112420/http://www.grammy.com/Latin/8_latin/

Latin Grammy Awards by year
Latin Grammy Awards
Latin Grammy Awards
Grammy Awards
Latin Grammy Awards